Poeciliinae is a subfamily of killifish from the family Poeciliidae which contains species from the Americas which are collectively known as the livebearers because many, but not all, of the species within the subfamily are ovoviviparous.

Characteristics
All of the members of the subfamily Poeciliinae are ovoviviparous, i.e. they give birth to live young, except Tomereus, with internal fertilisation and a large yolk in the egg. The males have the anterior rays, normally the third to fifth rays, in the anal fin elongated to form an intromittent organ called the gonopodium.

Habitat and distribution
The Poeciliinae are predominantly freshwater fish but some species live in brackish water, and some can even tolerate seawater. They are found in North America as far north as southern Canada, Central America and South America through to Patagonia. Some of the world's most popular aquarium fish such as guppies, swordtails and mollies are from this subfamily. They have been introduced to many regions in the world, either accidentally or to control mosquitoes, and have become invasive species threatening local populations of similar, small fishes. For example, the Eastern mosquitofish Gambusia holbrooki is considered to be one of the 100 worst invasive species in the world and is responsible for declines in small native aquatic species worldwide.

Subdivisions
The following tribes and genera are classified within the subfamily Poeciliinae:

 Tribe Alfarini Hubbs, 1924
Genus Alfaro Meek, 1912
 Tribe Priapellini Ghedotti, 2000
Genus Priapella Regan 1913
 Tribe Gambusiini Gill, 1889
Genus Belonesox Kner, 1860
Genus Brachyrhaphis Regan, 1913
Genus Gambusia Poey, 1854
Genus Heterophallus Regan, 1914
 Tribe Heterandriini Hubbs, 1924
Genus Heterandria Agassiz, 1853
Genus Neoheterandria Henn 1916
Genus Poeciliopsis Regan 1913
Genus Priapichthys Regan 1913
Genus Pseudopoecilia Regan 1913
Genus Pseudoxiphophorus Bleeker, 1860
Genus Xenophallus Hubbs, 1924 
 Tribe Girardini Hubbs, 1924
Genus Carlhubbsia Whitley, 1951
Genus Girardinus Poey, 1854
Genus Quintana Hubbs, 1934
 Tribe Poeciliini Bonaparte, 1831 
 Genus Limia Poey, 1854
 Genus Micropoecilia Hubbs, 1926
 Genus Pamphorichthys Regan, 1913
 Genus Phallichthys Hubbs, 1924
 Genus Poecilia Bloch & Schneider, 1801
 Genus Xiphophorus Heckel, 1848
 Tribe Cnesterodontini Hubbs, 1924
 Genus Cnesterodon Garman, 1895
 Genus Phalloceros Eigenmann, 1907
 Genus Phalloptychus Eigenmann, 1907
 Genus Phallotorynus Henn, 1916
 Genus Tomeurus Eigenmann, 1909
 Tribe Scolichthyini Rosen, 1967
 Genus Scolichthys Rosen, 1967
 Tribe Xenodexini Hubbs, 1950
Genus Xenodexia Hubbs, 1950

References

Fish subfamilies
Poeciliidae
Taxa named by Charles Lucien Bonaparte